This is a list of progressive rock supergroups, with each band's founding line-up and members who joined within a year of founding. This list contains only groups which have performed more than a single song or live show together.

List of progressive rock supergroups by decade

References